Millennium Place is a luxury residential building located in Boston, Massachusetts. The building completes Boston's Avery Street corridor development, which includes the Ritz Carlton Hotel & Residences, Equinox Fitness Club, and the AMC Loews Boston Common movie theater.

Designed by Handel Architects of New York City; Millennium Place is 256 units, was completed in the autumn of 2013, and became the fastest selling residential property in Boston history.

References

See also 
 List of tallest buildings in Boston

Residential skyscrapers in Boston
Residential buildings completed in 2013